Downhill is a form of alpine skiing competition. Whereas the other alpine skiing events (slalom, giant slalom, super giant slalom, and combined) emphasize turning and technique, downhill emphasizes "the six components of technique, courage, speed, risk, physical condition and judgement", according to the FIS "International Ski Competition Rules (ICR)". Athletes must have an aerodynamically efficient tuck position to minimize drag and increase speed.

The term, "downhill skiing", is also used as a synonym for alpine skiing as a recreational activity.

History
The rules for downhill skiing competitions were originally developed by Sir Arnold Lunn for the 1921 British National Ski Championships.

Course
The FIS has rules for downhill courses that encompass their general characteristics, width, safety precautions, vertical drop, course length, style and placement of gates.
General characteristics – As a test of "technique, courage, speed, risk, physical condition and judgement", the course requires the athlete to adapt to the technically demanding terrain and layout of gates.
Safety – Obstacles on courses are expected to be protected with nets, fences, or pads.
Races with two runs may be shorter.
Course length – Courses require an accurate means of measurement for length.
Gates – Gates consist of pairs of twin poles with a rectangular panel between the poles.

Equipment

Equipment for the downhill is different from the alpine events that are lower-speed.  Skis are 30% longer than those used in slalom, for more stability at high speed. They usually have rounded, low-profile tips rather than pointed tips.  Ski poles are bent so as to curve around the body as the racer stays in a "tuck position" and may have aerodynamic, cone-shaped baskets. As in other alpine disciplines, downhill racers wear skin-tight suits to minimize drag, and helmets are mandatory.

Races

In all forms of downhill, both at a local youth-level as well as the higher FIS international level, racers are allowed extensive preparation for the race, which includes daily course inspection and discussion with their coaches and teammates as well as several practice runs before the actual race. Racers do not make any unnecessary turns while on the course, and try to do everything they can to maintain the most aerodynamic position while negotiating turns and jumps.

Unlike slalom and giant slalom, where racers have the times of two runs combined, the downhill race is a single run. Times are typically between 1½ and 2½ minutes for World Cup courses and must be over 1 minute in duration to meet international minimum standards. Tenths and hundredths and, occasionally, thousandths of seconds count: World Cup races and Olympic medals have sometimes been decided by as little as one or two hundredths of a second, and ties are not unheard of.

The most successful all-time winners of World Cup downhill races are Annemarie Moser-Pröll of Austria (36 wins, 7 women's titles) and Franz Klammer of Austria (25 wins, 5 men's titles). Lindsey Vonn of the U.S. is currently dominant in woman's downhill racing with a lifetime total of 37 World Cup downhill wins and 7 women's titles.

Risks

Safety netting and padding are placed where race officials anticipate potential crashes. Despite these safety precautions, the ski racing community is well aware of the inherent risks of downhill skiing, for it is possible for racers to suffer serious injury or death while practising or competing. Three deaths among World Cup racers in recent years in downhill training or during a race were those of Austrians Gernot Reinstadler (1991) and Ulrike Maier (1994), and Frenchman Régine Cavagnoud (2001). Also in 2001, Swiss downhiller Silvano Beltrametti was paralyzed in a high-speed crash and 1984 Olympic gold medalist Bill Johnson suffered permanent brain damage that eventually led to a crippling stroke which left him unable to function without assistance. Most recently Frenchman David Poisson was killed in a training crash in 2017. Speaking to media after Poisson's death, French former downhiller Luc Alphand noted that "eliminating risk entirely in downhill is impossible".

Men's World Cup podiums
In the following table men's downhill World Cup podium results in the World Cup since the first season in 1967. Winners receive a distinctive crystal globe.

Women's World Cup podiums
In the following table women's downhill World Cup podium results in the World Cup since the first season in 1967. Winners receive a distinctive crystal globe.

Downhill at the "big competitions"

Medal table

Medalists 

(*) - also served as WCH (GS and Combined were competed as well but did not count four WOG)

See also
List of men's World Cup Downhill title winners
List of women's World Cup Downhill title winners
List of Olympic medalists in men's Downhill
List of Olympic medalists in women's Downhill
List of Paralympic medalists in men's Downhill
List of Paralympic medalists in women's Downhill
List of World Champions in Downhill
List of men's downhill races in the FIS Alpine Ski World Cup

References

Alpine skiing